Fred McNair and Sherwood Stewart were the defending champions but lost in the first round to Greg Halder and Dale Power.

Brian Gottfried and Raúl Ramírez won in the final 7–6, 4–6, 6–3, 6–4 against Wojciech Fibak and Jan Kodeš.

Seeds

Draw

Finals

Top half

Section 1

Section 2

Bottom half

Section 3

Section 4

References

External links
1977 French Open – Men's draws and results at the International Tennis Federation

Men's Doubles
French Open by year – Men's doubles